Jamai Johannes Loman (born 30 June 1986) is a Dutch singer, musical actor and presenter who was the winner of the first series of Idols, the Dutch variant of Pop Idol.

Biography
Loman (at that time living with his parents and two elder sisters, Naomi and Chantal), grew up in Schoonhoven, where he started his "career" in a school musical. He also performed at the school's "Shownight" in 2000, and played in the school jazzband called 8CC.

In 2003, he entered the Dutch Idols competition. To his surprise, he survived round after round and was voted the winner. At the 2003, World Idol however, he only received 36 points and came in last, with a slashing Jury report.

Shortly after releasing his third single, Loman decided to move from the music business to acting and he starred in the musicals Doornroosje (Sleeping Beauty), Hello, Dolly! and Jesus Christ Superstar.  January 2007, he was in The Wiz, where he is playing the role of the Wiz and alternating the role of the Scarecrow.

In 2008, Loman played the role of Marius in the Dutch revival version of Les Misérables, for which he received a John Kraaijkamp Musical Award for ‘Best Supporting Actor’ in a large musical production.

In 2009, Loman is set to play the part of Bobby Strong in the M-Lab production of Urinetown.

Since 2016, he is one of the jury members of Idols 2016. The other jury members are Eva Simons, Martijn Krabbe and Jeroen Nieuwenhuis.

In 2021 was Loman the winner of the third season of the Dutch version of the Masked Singer as Cupido.

In 2022, he was a co-presenter of the third season of the show Lego Masters.

Personal life 
At the end of 2003, Loman confirmed his suspicions in Ruud de Wild's radio program that he is gay. He stated that he was in a relationship with Boris Schreurs, one of his dancers. After that, he was in a relationship with Ron Link for quite some time. In November 2008, the couple broke up after being together for almost two years. Loman got into a relationship with actor Michael Muller in 2010. This relationship ended after more than two years in April 2012.

In 2018, Loman had a kidney transplant due to kidney failure.

Dutch Idol Performances

 Top 30: Always on My Mind by Willie Nelson
 Top 10: Everything I Do, I Do It For You by Bryan Adams
 Top 09: Love Is All Around
 Top 08: Sorry Seems To Be The Hardest Word by Elton John
 Top 07: De Vleugels Van Mijn Vlucht 
 Top 06: Relight My Fire by Take That 
 Top 05: Always
 Top 04: Angels by Robbie Williams
 Top 04: Let's Get Loud by Jennifer Lopez
 Top 03: If You Don't Know Me By Now by Simply Red
 Top 03: Celebration by Kool and The Gang
 Finale: Sorry Seems To Be The Hardest Word by Elton John
 Finale: Your Song by Elton John
 Finale: Step Right Up

Discography

 2003 Step Right Up, Single
 2003 Greatest Moments, Idols Album
 2003 Jamai, Album
 2003 When you walk in the room, Single (ft. Dewi, 4th place Idols)
 2004 Wango Tango, Single
 2005 Super Guppie zingt, Album starring different artists, in connection with the Dutch "Children's Books Week"
 2006 Jesus Christ Superstar, Dutch Original Cast Album
 2018 Genoeg Te Doen, Album

Theater
2003 Bij Paul op de koffie, Theater tour with Dutch artist Paul de Leeuw
2004 Musical Doornroosje (Sleeping Beauty), Jonathan, Nationale Tour, Studio 100
2004–2005 Hello, Dolly!, Barnaby Tucker, Dutch tour
2005–2006 Jesus Christ Superstar, Simon Zealotes, Nationale Tour, Joop van den Ende theaterproducties/Stage-entertainment
2006 Musicals in Ahoy''' – Rotterdam Ahoy
2006–2007 The Wiz, Scarecrow en The Wiz, Beatrix Theater Utrecht, Joop van den Ende Theaterproducties/Stage Entertainment
2008 Les Misérables, Marius, Luxor Theater Rotterdam – Royal Theatre Carré Amsterdam, Joop van den Ende theaterproducties/Stage-entertainment
2009 Urinetown, Bobby Strong, M-Lab
2009–2010 Disney Musical Sing a long, Soloist.
2010 Joseph and the amazing technicolor dreamcoat, Alternate Joseph, Joop van den Ende Theaterproducties.
2010–2011 Urinetown, Bobby Strong, Nationale Tour, Joop van den Ende theaterproducties/Stage-entertainment
2011 Maria!, Teunis, M-lab Amsterdam
2011–2012 De Winnaar, M-Lab Amsterdam
2012 Droomvlucht, Krakeel, Theater De Efteling, Joop van den Ende Theaterproducties/Stage Entertainment
2012 Miss Saigon, Chris, Beatrix Theater Utrecht, Joop van den Ende Theaterproducties/Stage Entertainment
2012–2013 Shrek, Heer Farquaad, RAI Theater Amsterdam en Nationale Tour, Albert Verlinde Entertainment

Awards

 In 2003, Loman won the "Gouden Vedel", a price awarded by the Dutch Association of Dancing Teachers to artists who release a good dance record. He received this award for his single Step Right Up, used in dancing classes for learning the cha-cha-cha.
 Loman won the "John Kraaijkamp Musical Award 2005" for Best Upcoming Talent, for his role of Barnaby Tucker in Hello, Dolly!. The Award includes a scholarship of Euro10,000.
 Nominated for the "John Kraaijkamp Musical Award 2006" for Best Male Supporting Role for Simon in Jesus Christ Superstar.
 In 2008, Loman won the "John Kraaijkamp Musical Award 2008" for Best Male Supporting Role for Marius Pontmercy in Les Misérables.

Miscellaneous

 In October 2006, Loman started presenting the children's Television program Jetix Max, together with actress Nicolette van Dam.
 In December 2006, he dubbed the voice for penguin Mumble in the animated movie Happy Feet.
 Loman has been an Ambassador for the Make-A-Wish Foundation in the Netherlands since May 2004.
 In July 2009, Loman was announced the winner of the fourth season of the Dutch Dancing with the Stars.''
 From July till August 2009 Loman is also co-presenting the "waar is Elvis" (where is Elvis) television show for RTL4.

References

External links

 Official Website
 Jamai Loman at IMDb

1986 births
Living people
Dutch male musical theatre actors
Dutch people of Indonesian descent
Dutch pop singers
Idols (TV series) winners
Dancing with the Stars winners
Contestants on Dutch game shows
People from Gouda, South Holland
People from Schoonhoven
Masked Singer winners
Gay singers
Dutch gay musicians
Dutch LGBT singers
21st-century Dutch male singers